Salvia chunganensis is an annual herb that is native to Fujian province in China, typically growing in  tufts of grass. Inflorescences are 2–6 flowered verticillasters in racemes or panicles, with a  purplish blue or reddish white corolla.

Notes

chunganensis
Flora of China